Eliane Umuhire is a Rwandan actress and comedian born in Kigali.

Filmography 

 Trees of Peace as Annick, 2022
 Neptune Frost as Memory, 2021
 Birds Are Singing in Kigali as Claudine Mugambira, 2017

Awards 

 2017: Best Actress, Karlovy Vary International Film Festival (KVIFF)
 2017: Silver Hugo Award for Best Actress, Chicago International Film Festival for Birds Are Singing in Kigali
 2018: MasterCard Rising Star at International Festival of Independent Cinema Off Camera for Birds Are Singing in Kigali
 2018: Let’s CEE Award Best Acting Performance

References 

21st-century Rwandan women
Rwandan actresses
Rwandan film actors
People from Kigali
Living people
21st-century actresses
Year of birth missing (living people)